"" is a song by Albanian singer and songwriter Alban Ramosaj. The song was written by Ramosaj and Fifi, while produced by Bruno. It was independently released as a single for digital download and streaming on 8 May 2021. Its musically a pop song backed by Albanian folk, Spanish flamenco, and Mediterranean components. The Albanian-language lyrics see Ramosaj singing about a perplexing and desperate romance he experienced in Spain. Some music critics met the song with positive reviews, pointing out Ramosaj's vocal delivery and his visual interpretation.

During his performance, the background LED screens displayed Andalusian-inspired imagery, creating a Mediterranean atmosphere.

Background and composition 

For the completion of the song, Ramosaj hired the ThreeDots production team, with him contributing to the composition and lyrics of "" alongside Albanian singers Bruno and Fifi; Bruno also produced the song. In an interview, Ramosaj stated that the song dives into personal experiences and described it as "one of the most difficult songs to write". He further stated that, despite being mostly created in its composition and lyrics, the song had remained uncompleted for a year as a result of personal issues. Musically, "" is an Albanian-language pop track with a blend of Albanian folk, Spanish flamenco, guitars, and Mediterranean influences. Dedicated to a Spanish girl, "" lyrically touches on a perplexing and desperate romance, with the title, translated into English as "Knives of Mine", used as a metaphor to describe "anger, jealousy, possessiveness, and repressed" emotions.

Release and reception 

Ramosaj independently released "" as a single for digital download and streaming in various countries on 8 May 2021. Upon its release, the song received positive reviews from two music critics. Deban Aderemi, writing for Wiwibloggs,  thought that "when [Ramosaj] belts out those notes and beats his chest, you realise he isn't just unleashing anger and pain.". Aderemi further commended the singer's "stunning" performance, writing that "when he sings, he wears his heart on his sleeve, and transfixes his audience with his hypnotic eyes." "" was also celebrated by the staff of Illyrian Pirates as a "fantastic" song, highlighting Ramosaj's visual presentation and opining that it accompanies the track well, which, together with the Mediterranean-described setting, emphasises the song's lyrics.

Kënga Magjike 

In accordance with the contest's tradition, "" was officially presented before the live shows of Kënga Magjike on the TV Klan's programme  on 9 May 2021. During the grand final on 29 May, the singer emerged as the winner of the contest, receiving the highest number of points from the juries, participants, and public. Onstage, Ramosaj was accompanied by three instrumentalists and four backing vocalists. He performed in front of a red and orange coloured LED wall, while displaying an Andalusian architecture-described image. In a positive review from Illyrian Pirates, the editor felt that the visuals created an Andalusian atmosphere, with the imagery reminding him of the Court of the Lions in the Palace of Alhambra, Granada, Spain.

Credits and personnel 

Credits adapted from YouTube.

Alban Ramosajcomposing, songwriting, vocals
Brunoproducing
Fifisongwriting

Track listing 

Digital download
""2:49

Release history

References 

2021 singles
2021 songs
Albanian-language songs
Songs written by Fifi (singer)
Kënga Magjike songs